The Flore des Mascareignes (Fl. Mascar.) is a Flora, in French, covering the three islands in the Mascarenes: Réunion, Mauritius and Rodrigues.

Project history

The project began in the early 1970s, prepared jointly in Britain, France and Mauritius, by the Mauritius Sugar Industry Research Institute (MSIRI), Royal Botanic Gardens, Kew, and L'Office de la Recherche Scientifique et Technique Outre-Mer (ORSTOM). The completion of the Flora was funded by the EC's European Development Fund (1996).

The first editors appointed were J. Bosser (Editor-in-Chief), W. Marais, and Dr. R. Julien, with Dr. R.E. Vaughan as adviser. The first taxonomist was M.J.E. Coode, who worked on the Flora until the end of 1975; he was replaced by I.B.K. Richardson in 1976, who spent 6 weeks collecting in the Mascarenes. The first part of the Flora was published in 1976.

The Flora treats the native flora in detail, including ferns, but includes naturalised and commonly cultivated plants. 

Editors have been R. Antoine (MSIRI), J.C. Autrey (MSIRI), J. Bosser (IRD), J.P.M. Brenan (Kew), J. Heslop-Harrison (Kew), I.K. Ferguson (Kew), G.Mangenot (ORSTOM), C. Soopramanien (MSIRI).

The Mascarenes have a high level of endemism, about 65%, with some shared between the islands of the archipelago. Others are found only on a single island, Rodrigues (47), Réunion (165) and Mauritius (273). Some are already extinct while most are threatened.

Botanical history
There has been a long history of botanical studies on the islands of Mauritius and Réunion. The botany of Rodriguez was not studied until 1879.

 Bojer, W. (1837) Hortus Mauritianus: ou énumération des plantes, exotiques et indigènes, qui croissent a l'Ile Maurice, disposées d'après la méthode naturelle. at the Biodiversity Heritage Library.   

 James Backhouse (1844). A Narrative of a Visit to the Mauritius and South Africa 

 Baker, J. Gilbert (1877). Flora of Mauritius and the Seychelles :a description of the flowering plants and ferns of those islands. Published under the authority of the Colonial Government of Mauritius. Published:London : L. Reeve. 

 Isaac Bayley Balfour (1879). The physical features of Rodriguez. Philosophical transactions of the Royal Society 168:289-292 

 - Introductory remarks. (1879). Philosophical transactions 168:302-325 

 - Flowering Plants and Ferns. (1879). Philosophical transactions 168:326-387 

 Eugène Jacob de Cordemoy (1895). Flore de l'île de la Réunion (phanérogames, cryptogames, vasculaires, muscinées) avec l'indication des propriétés économiques & industrielles des plantes. 

 H. H. Johnston (1896). Additions To The Flora Of Mauritius, As Recorded In Baker's “Flora Of Mauritius And The Seychelles.”, Transactions of the Botanical Society of Edinburgh, 20:1-4, 391-407, 

 Vaughan, R.E. (1937). Contributions to the flora of Mauritius.—I. An account of the naturalized flowering plants recorded from Mauritius since the publication of Baker's ‘Flora of Mauritius and the Seychelles’. Journal of the Linnean Society of London, Botany 51: 285-308

Origins
The Mascarenes are volcanic in origin. Reunion is the largest island, formed about 3 million years ago, rising to 3070m with an active volcano.  Mauritius and Rodrigues were formed about 8-10 million years ago.  Mauritius consists of large plains with steep mountains surrounding them, the remnants of an old caldera, that are only 828m high. Rodrigues is the smallest of the islands and is much eroded, reaching 398m high at Mt Limon.

Families

References

External links
Checklist of flowering plants of the island of Mauritius, Indian Ocean
Flore de la Reunion
Mascarine-Cadetiana

Mascarenes
Flora of the Mascarene Islands